The 1968 British Open Championship was held at the Lansdowne Club in London from 12–20 December 1967. Jonah Barrington won his second consecutive title defeating Abdelfattah Abou Taleb in the final.

Seeds

Draw and results

First round
 Mike Thurgur 	beat	 M McDonald 	9-2 10-9 9-0
 Clive Francis	beat	 John Upton 	9-4 9-4 9-2
 Aly Abdel Aziz 	beat	 J L Moore 	9-0 9-2 9-6
 Mike Hill 	beat	 John Skinner 	5-9 9-2 9-2 9-6
 Nigel Broomfield 	beat	 Patrick Keenan 	9-2 9-5 9-1
 Richard Boddington 	beat	 Samir Nadim 	9-5 9-10 9-4 5-9 9-3
 Chris Stahl 	beat	 Richard White 	9-2 9-6 6-9 9-4
 Nigel Faulks 	beat	 J S Barton 9-5 6-9 9-1 9-5
 Barry Jones 	beat	 T D Phillips	4-9 10-8 9-5 6-9 9-1
 Peter Richards 	beat	 Philip E Goodwin 	9-7 9-3 ret
 John Ward 	beat	 Peter Stokes 	9-4 9-3 8-10 2-0 9-6
 Don Innes 	beat	 Paul Millman 	4-9 9-6 10-9 9-0
 John Easter 	beat	 Chris Orriss 	9-2 9-3 4-9 9-5
 Alan Sims 	beat	 Arthur Catherine 	9-6 2-9 9-7 9-5
 Peter Chalk	beat	 John Ward 	4-9 9-7 9-1 9-10 9-6
 Michael Griffiths 	beat	 Richard Hawkey 	9-7 9-5 4-9 10-8

Second round
 Mike Thurgur 	beat	 Barry Jones 9-3 6-9 9-5 9-6
 Clive Francis 	beat	 Peter Richards 4-9 7 10-9 9-6
 Aly Abdel Aziz beat	 John Ward 	9-4 9-2 3-9 9-7
 Mike Hill 	beat	 Don Innes 	9-1 9-5 6-9 9-7
 Nigel Broomfield 	beat	 John Easter 	9-2 9-3 9-1
 Richard Boddington	beat	 Alan Sims 	9-5 9-2 9-2
 Chris Stahl 	beat	 Peter Chalk 	9-6 9-5 2-9 9-7
 Michael Griffiths 	beat	 Nigel Faulks 	5-9 9-6 9-6

Main draw

Third Place
 Jeremy Lyon beat  Kamal Zaghloul 5-9 9-2 9-6 9-3

References

Men's British Open Squash Championships
Men's British Open Championship
Men's British Open Squash Championship
Men's British Open Squash Championship
Men's British Open Squash Championship
Squash competitions in London